Radio Gradiška is a Bosnian local public radio station, broadcasting from Gradiška, Republika Srpska, Bosnia and Herzegovina.

It was launched on 29 September 1979 by the municipal council of Bosanska Gradiška. In Yugoslavia and in SR Bosnia and Herzegovina, it was part of local/municipal Radio Sarajevo network affiliate.

This radio station broadcasts a variety of programs such as local news, music, sport and talk shows. Program is mainly produced in Serbian.

Estimated number of listeners of Radio Gradiška is around 45,262. Radiostation is also available in neighboring Croatia.

Frequencies 
 Gradiška

History 
Radio Gradiška officially started operating on September 29, 1979. The first editorial board of Radio Gradiška consisted of: Gojko Šerbula, director, journalists: Božo Šćepanović, Nenad Trifunović, Vlado Slijepčević and Jovan-Joco Dakić, music editor Milutin Stajčić, speakers Alma Hadžijusufović and Dubravka Lovrenović. The technical implementers were Nazif Čatak and Ivanka Kolundžić. The head of accounting is Dragica Marjanović, and the secretary of the editorial board is Enisa Zahirović. Within the Information Center, in addition to Radio Gradiška, the main activities were the correspondence offices for radio and television stations in the former Yugoslavia, and for the "Tanjug" Agency, newspapers: "Glas", "Oslobođenje", "Večernje novosti", "Politika" and "Vijesnik". For years, Radio Gradiška was a meeting place for well-known journalists from the major newsrooms of the former Yugoslavia.

See also 
List of radio stations in Bosnia and Herzegovina

References

External links 
 Official site
 www.fmscan.org
 Communications Regulatory Agency of Bosnia and Herzegovina

Gradiška
Radio stations established in 1979